Bruno Filipe Santos Matias (born 4 March 1989, in Santarém) is a Portuguese footballer who plays for FC Etzella Ettelbruck, as a  midfielder.

External links

References

1989 births
Living people
People from Santarém, Portugal
Portuguese footballers
C.D. Fátima players
Association football midfielders
Sportspeople from Santarém District